Bromovirus is a genus of viruses, in the family Bromoviridae. Plants serve as natural hosts. There are six species in this genus.

Taxonomy
The following species are assigned to the genus:
 Broad bean mottle virus
 Brome mosaic virus
 Cassia yellow blotch virus
 Cowpea chlorotic mottle virus
 Melandrium yellow fleck virus
 Spring beauty latent virus

Structure
Viruses in the genus Bromovirus are non-enveloped, with icosahedral geometries, and T=3 symmetry. The diameter is around 26 nm. Genomes are linear and segmented, tripartite.

Life cycle
Viral replication is cytoplasmic. Entry into the host cell is achieved by penetration into the host cell. Replication follows the positive stranded RNA virus replication model. Positive stranded rna virus transcription, using the internal initiation model of subgenomic RNA transcription is the method of transcription. The virus exits the host cell by tubule-guided viral movement. Plants serve as the natural host. Transmission routes are mechanical and contact.

Recombination
Brome mosaic virus (BMV) genomes are able to undergo RNA-RNA homologous recombination upon infection of plant cells.  The RNA-dependent RNA polymerase specified by the BMV genome appears to undergo template switching (copy choice) recombination during viral RNA synthesis.

References

External links
 ICTV Report: Bromoviridae
 Viralzone: Bromovirus

Bromoviridae
Virus genera